Big Stan is a 2007 American prison comedy film starring, produced and directed by Rob Schneider in his directorial debut with help from his company From Out of Nowhere Productions while the rest of the cast consisting of Jennifer Morrison, Scott Wilson, Henry Gibson, Richard Kind, Sally Kirkland, Jackson Rathbone, M. Emmet Walsh and David Carradine. It tells the story of a real estate con artist who gets sentenced to three years in prison and spends the six months before it getting trained to survive in prison by a martial arts guru. This film was Gibson's final role before his death in 2009.

Although released in some markets during the fall of 2008, it was released straight to DVD in the U.S. on March 24, 2009. It debuted at number 17 on the DVD rental charts of March 23–30, 2009.

Plot
Stan Minton (Rob Schneider) is a wealthy real estate con artist, married to Mindy (Jennifer Morrison). One day, he is arrested for conning elderly people out of their savings. His lawyer Mal (Richard Kind) defends him at the trial presided over by Judge Perry (Richard Riehle) as the forewoman (Sally Kirkland) finds him guilty where the sentencing will be tomorrow.

While talking with Stan, Mal refuses to bribe Judge Perry since he does not practice that kind of law and states to Stan that any shyster on the street would do it for him. Inspired by the bench advertisement outside, Stan fires Mal from the case and hires Lew Popper (M. Emmet Walsh) as a replacement for the sentencing. Judge Perry sentences Stan to 3 years at the Oakfield Correctional Facility while giving him 6 months by Judge Perry to "reorganize the charity" Stan established to teach music to mentally disabled children.

As he can't go on a permanent vacation to Brazil on Lew's advice due to his assets being frozen, Stan's fear of jailhouse rape strains his marriage to Mindy. This leads him to hire the mysterious guru known as "The Master" (David Carradine) who helps transform him into a martial-arts expert.

During his incarceration, Stan befriends an elderly inmate named Larry who is serving a life sentence for murdering his partner. Stan also befriends a sympathetic prison guard named Bullard (Kevin Gage) and learns more about the cliques and gang activities formed inside the prison. He then uses his new-found skills to bring peace and harmony to the prison yard by intimidating his fellow inmates like Big Raymond (Bob Sapp) into preventing them from harming each other. With this, peace is restored in at Verlaine State Correctional Facility and Stan gains their respect, eventually becoming their leader.

However, the corrupt warden Gasque (Scott Wilson) has plans to force its closure with a riot and sell off the property as valuable real estate. Stan helps him with the real estate aspects in exchange for early parole. However, his peacemaking efforts threaten the warden's plan for a riot and he is persuaded to bring back violence.

In a last minute attack of conscience, he deliberately blows the parole hearing to rush back and prevent the deaths of his fellow inmates only to discover that his message of peace has sunk in and the prisoners are dancing instead of fighting. Warden Gasque orders the guards to open fire on the dancing men. When they refuse, he grabs a gun in front of the Board of Governors and shoots wildly. Warden Gasque attempts to shoot Stan, but he is stopped by Mindy and the Master, who had sneaked in. Stan was surprised that the Master had trained Mindy during his incarceration when he thought they were having an affair during an earlier Conjugal.

Three years later, Stan leaves the prison where Bullard had been sworn in as the new warden of Verlaine State Correctional Facility. Gasque becomes the new inmate following his arrest for his illegal activities as Big Raymond intimidates him to say goodbye to Stan. Lew is also an inmate after he had foreseen that he would be arrested for having slept with a member of the jury and for being a corrupted lawyer. Stan is met by his wife, his young daughter Mindy Jr., and the Master outside the prison. While the Master has become Mindy Jr.'s nanny, Stan is annoyed that he has been smoking near her.

Cast
 Rob Schneider as "Big" Stan Minton, a rich real estate con artist.
 Jennifer Morrison as Mindy Minton, Stan's wife.
 Scott Wilson as Francis Gasque, the corrupt prison warden of Verlaine State Correctional Facility who seeks to get the prison closed down so that he can sell the land.
 Henry Gibson as Larry / "Shorts", an inmate that Stan befriends who is serving a life sentence for killing his partner.
 Richard Kind as Mal, Stan's lawyer.
 Sally Kirkland as Madame Foreman, a jury member that finds Stan guilty.
 Jackson Rathbone as Robbie, an inmate who is a hippie and former drug dealer.
 M. Emmet Walsh as Lew Popper, a shyster that Stan replaces Mal with during his trial.
 David Carradine as The Master, a martial arts guru that trains Stan to survive prison.
 Marcelo Ortega as Big Haa, an inmate.
 Marcia Wallace as Alma
 Diego Corrales as Julio
 Randy Couture as Carnahan
 Don Frye as Nation Member
 Brandon Molale as Guard Piken
 Lil Rob as Inmate
 Brandon T. Jackson as Deshawn, an inmate.
 Olivia Munn as Maria, a secretary.
 Barbara Dodd as Mrs. Darby, an old lady that Stan tried to con.
 Richard Riehle as Judge Perry, a judge that presides over Stan's trial.
 Kevin Gage as Bullard, a sympathetic prison guard.
 Dan Inosanto as Prison Chef
 Bob Sapp as Big Raymond, a tough inmate.
 Tsuyoshi Abe as Dang, a Vietnamese Mafia member and one of the Master's students.
 Ahman Green as Lee Otis, a former bank robber and inmate.
 Salvator Xuereb as Patterson, the leader of the Nazi Prison Gang.
 Buddy Lewis as Cleon, the leader of the Black Prison Gang.
 Peter Vasquez as Juanito, the leader of the Mexican Prison Gang.
 Megan Cavanagh as a Parole Board member.
 Dan Haggerty as an ex-con who is gay
 Faith Womack as Mindy Jr., Stan and Mindy's daughter.
 Andrew Bernhard as Inmate

Rob Schneider's mother Pilar cameos as one of the Board of Governors. Wes Takahashi, former animator and visual effects supervisor for Industrial Light & Magic, makes a cameo appearance as a bartender.

Production

Reception
On Rotten Tomatoes the film has an approval rating of 11% based on reviews from 9 critics (1 positive, 8 negative), with an average rating of 3.00/10.

Julie Rigg of the Australian Broadcasting Corporation was highly critical of the rape-based humor, and concluded " I wasted two valuable hours of my life on Big Stan—don't make the same mistake." Writing for The Sydney Morning Herald, Paul Byrnes asked "If there's been a clumsier, dumber, more casually put together collection of badly timed gags, racial stereotypes and lazy performances this year, I have yet to see it...How could [Schneider] be in so many movies over a 20-year career and learn so little about making a movie?" Brian Orndorf of DVDTalk.com called it "a forgettable, unfunny waste of time". He criticized the "unrelenting" repetition of rape jokes, but believed that Schneider acted the character's fear of rape convincingly.

MovieHole rated it 3.5 out of 5 and called it Schneider's best film since The Hot Chick.

References

External links
 
 

2007 films
2000s crime comedy films
American crime comedy films
American prison comedy films
Films directed by Rob Schneider
Films shot in California
Crystal Sky Pictures films
2007 directorial debut films
2007 comedy films
Films about rape
2000s English-language films
2000s American films